Edward Charles John "Eddie" Litzenberger (July 15, 1932 – November 1, 2010) was a Canadian ice hockey right winger from Neudorf, Saskatchewan.  Litzenberger was "donated" to the Chicago Black Hawks by the Montreal Canadiens in his first year in the National Hockey League (NHL). At the time the Black Hawks were struggling to survive as a franchise,  and the league governors decided to help the team remain viable.

Playing career
Litzenberger began his hockey career with the Regina Pats in the Western Canada Junior Hockey League. In 1950–51, he led the league in scoring with 44 goals in 40 games and led the playoffs in scoring with 14 goals in 12 games. In 1952–53, he made his debut with the Montreal Canadiens, playing two games with the Canadiens while splitting his time with the Montreal Royals. He won the Rookie of the Year Award in the Quebec Senior Hockey League, and was chosen for the Second All-Star Team.

After playing 29 games with the Canadiens, Litzenberger was traded to the Chicago Black Hawks in 1954–55. He posted 40 points in 44 games with the Black Hawks and was awarded the Calder Memorial Trophy. He also played in the NHL All-Star Game that year. After posting three consecutive 30-goal seasons and being named to the NHL Second All-Star Team in 1956–57, he was named Captain of the Chicago Black Hawks in 1957–58. He led a Black Hawks team that included future Hall of Famers Bobby Hull, Stan Mikita, Pierre Pilote and Glenn Hall to a Stanley Cup championship in 1960–61, Chicago's first Stanley Cup since 1937–38.

Litzenberger was traded to the Detroit Red Wings after the Black Hawks had won the Stanley Cup, and traded again midway through the season to the Toronto Maple Leafs. He helped the Leafs win three consecutive Stanley Cups from 1962 to 1964. After that, he was sent down to the American Hockey League with the Rochester Americans and won the Calder Cup for two consecutive seasons with the Americans before retiring.

Litz was unique for having won four consecutive Stanley Cups while playing for two different teams. He helped instill a winning attitude as a member of the Black Hawks after having been traded from a first-place to a last-place team after noting a defeatist attitude among the players. Some of his teammates were satisfied with a tie. He reminded them that a tie was not a win and not worth celebrating.

He is also the only player in North American hockey history to win six straight pro hockey championships by winning the Stanley Cup in 1961, 1962, 1963 and 1964, and the Calder Cup in 1965 and 1966.

He spent his final years living in Ontario.

Achievements
QSHL Top Rookie of the Year Award winner in 1953.
Selected to the QSHL Second All-Star Team in 1953.
Selected to the QHL Second All-Star Team in 1954.
Calder Memorial Trophy winner in 1955.
Played in 1955, 1957, 1958, 1959, 1962, and 1963 NHL All-Star Games.
Selected to the NHL Second All-Star Team in 1957.
Stanley Cup champion in 1961 (Chicago Black Hawks).
Stanley Cup champion in 1962, 1963 and 1964 (Toronto Maple Leafs).
Calder Cup champion in 1965, and 1966 (Rochester Americans).

Career statistics

Regular season and playoffs

Death
Litzenberger, died on November 1, 2010, age 78.

References

External links
 

1932 births
2010 deaths
Calder Trophy winners
Canadian expatriate ice hockey players in the United States
Canadian ice hockey forwards
Chicago Blackhawks captains
Chicago Blackhawks players
Detroit Red Wings players
Ice hockey people from Saskatchewan
Montreal Canadiens players
People from Neudorf, Saskatchewan
Regina Pats players
Saskatchewan Huskies ice hockey players
Stanley Cup champions
Toronto Maple Leafs players